Daniel Spencer (July 20, 1794 – December 8, 1868)   was the last mayor of Nauvoo, Illinois prior to the revocation of its first charter.

Spencer was born in West Stockbridge, Massachusetts. In 1840, he joined the Church of Jesus Christ of Latter Day Saints. He soon after baptized his brother Orson Spencer.

Spencer served as a missionary to Canada in 1841.

Spencer left Nauvoo in February 1846.  In Winter Quarters, Nebraska he served as a bishop.   He arrived in the Salt Lake Valley in 1847 with the Perregrine Sessions Mormon pioneer company.

From 1852 to 1856 Spencer served as a missionary in the British Isles.

From 1849 to 1868 he served as president of the Salt Lake City Stake of the LDS Church. He served in the Utah Territorial House of Representatives in 1851.

Notes

References
Encyclopedia of Latter-day Saint History, p. 1174
Church History: Mormon Pioneer Overland Travel, 1847–1868 from the LDS Church official website

External links
Pioneer 1848-1868 Companies from Heritage Gateways: contains a story of Daniel Spencer promising someone they would be healed

1795 births
1868 deaths
19th-century Mormon missionaries
American Mormon missionaries in Canada
American Mormon missionaries in the United Kingdom
American leaders of the Church of Jesus Christ of Latter-day Saints
Converts to Mormonism
Members of the Utah Territorial Legislature
Mormon pioneers
People from Nauvoo, Illinois